Below are some Samoan plant names in alphabetical order in the Samoan language and their corresponding descriptions in English. Many are used in traditional medicines in the Samoa Islands comprising Samoa and American Samoa.

See also
List of protected areas of Samoa
National Park of American Samoa
Central Savai'i Rainforest, largest continuous patch of rainforest in Polynesia
List of birds of Samoa
List of mammals of Samoa
IUCN Red List of Threatened Species
Domesticated plants and animals of Austronesia

References

External links
Ministry of Natural Resources and Environment, Samoa.
American Samoa Environment Protection Agency
United Nations Development Programme (UNDP), Protected Areas
Samoa: Country Report to the FAO (Food and Agriculture Organisation of the United Nations) International Technical Conference on Plant Genetic Resources, (Leipzig, 1996); Report prepared by Seve T. Imo, William J. Cable, Apia, October, 1995.
Kava: its ceremonial use, An Account of Samoan History up to 1918 by Teo Tuvale.
Samoa Biodiversity Profile - International Treaty, Convention on Biological Diversity
 

Samoan words and phrases
 
 
Environment of Samoa
Environment of American Samoa
Plant common names
+Samoa